Pavlo Tychyna Museum (officially known as Literary and Memorial Museum of Pavlo Tychyna) is one of the museums in Kyiv, Ukraine, dedicated to Ukrainian writer Pavlo Tychyna.

The museum has been commenced in February 1989, and has been opened on January 27, 1980. The memorial flat was created at the premises where the poet lived from 1944 till 1967.

The museum has preserved the interiors of the rooms; it displays only the memorial belongings of the poet. The visitors can view the poet's library (over 20,000 books), the cabinet, the dining-room etc. The interiors reflect the epoch when Tychyna lived, demonstrating his how-to-live, interests so on.  

The museum offers regular and irregular exhibitions, organizes different cultural and memorial events.

References

External links 
 Website of the museum (in Ukrainian)

Museums in Kyiv
Shevchenkivskyi District, Kyiv